Hellinsia epileucus is a moth of the family Pterophoridae. It is found in Mexico, Costa Rica and Guatemala.

The wingspan is 14–15 mm. The antennae are white. The head is somewhat rough and white. The thorax is also white. The forewings are white, dusted with brownish scales. The hindwings are whitish, with a very faint tawny gloss. Adults are on wing in March, from May to June and from October to November.

References

Moths described in 1915
epileucus
Moths of Central America